Scotura contracta is a moth of the family Notodontidae. It is found in Brazil and French Guiana.

References

Moths described in 1923
Notodontidae of South America